Gregory Teodor Gerald Cork (born 29 September 1994) is an English cricketer who played for Derbyshire County Cricket Club. The son of former Derbyshire and England all-rounder Dominic Cork, Cork is a right-handed batsman who bowls left-arm medium-fast. He left Derbyshire upon the expiry of his contract at the end of the 2017 season. He has played in Australia as the overseas player at Surrey Hills Cricket Club in Melbourne.

References

External links

1994 births
Living people
Cricketers from Derby
People educated at Denstone College
English cricketers
Derbyshire cricketers
Staffordshire cricketers